Colleen Wagner (born in Elk Point, Alberta) is a Canadian playwright. She is best known for her 1995 play The Monument, which won the Governor General's Award for English-language drama at the 1996 Governor General's Awards. Her other plays have included Sand (1989), Eclipsed (1991), The Morning Bird (2005), Down from Heaven (2009) ''Home (2010) and 'The Living' (2019).

Wagner was educated at the Ontario College of Art and Design and the University of Toronto. She is an associate professor of screenwriting in the film studies department at York University.

References

External links
Colleen Wagner faculty page at York University

Living people
Canadian women dramatists and playwrights
Governor General's Award-winning dramatists
20th-century Canadian dramatists and playwrights
21st-century Canadian dramatists and playwrights
Writers from Alberta
Writers from Toronto
Academic staff of York University
20th-century Canadian women writers
21st-century Canadian women writers
Year of birth missing (living people)